International Socialism is a Trotskyist organisation in Uruguay. It is part of the International Socialist Tendency led by the British Socialist Workers Party.

It produces a newspaper called El Mundo al Revés.

Its former name was Revolutionary Left (Izquierda Revolucionaria)

External links
International Socialism web site (in Spanish)

International Socialist Tendency
Trotskyist organizations in Uruguay